Woodsetts is a village and civil parish in the Metropolitan Borough of Rotherham in South Yorkshire, England, on the border with Nottinghamshire. It lies between the towns of Dinnington and Worksop at an elevation of around 60 metres above sea level, and has a population of 1,802 reducing to 1,746 at the 2011 Census.

History
The first written record of Woodsetts is in a 13th-century quitclaim (dated 1220) held at the Derbyshire Record Office (Hatfield de Rodes papers) where a bovate of land 'in the territory of Lyndrick, in Wudsetes' is mentioned.  Other geographical locations mentioned nearby confirm that it is Woodsetts being referred to.

From its origins as a farming community, Woodsetts has expanded into a modest commuter base serving Worksop and Sheffield.

Facilities
There is one pub: The Butcher's Arms, and a primary school: Woodsetts Junior and Infant School. There is also a small shopping precinct and two churches: St George's (Church of England) and Woodsetts Methodist Church, a recreational ground and a small artificial games pitch.

Nearby
To the north of Woodsetts is the smaller satellite settlement of Gildingwells.

Fracking applications
Rotherham Borough Council twice refused planning permission for exploration at Woodsetts with regard to shale gas hydraulic fracturing (fracking) in 2018, in March and September. A further public enquiry is to be held in June 2019.

See also
Listed buildings in Woodsetts

References

External links

Woodsetts Cricket Club Website
Woodsetts Parish Council Website

Villages in South Yorkshire
Geography of the Metropolitan Borough of Rotherham
Civil parishes in South Yorkshire